Qeshlaq-e Hajj Amir Mashhadi Safer (also Romanized as Qeshlāq-e Ḩājj Amīr Mashhadī Şafer) is a village in Qeshlaq-e Shomali Rural District, in the Central District of Parsabad County, Ardabil Province, Iran. At the 2006 census, its population was 97, in 21 families.

References 

Towns and villages in Parsabad County